Guillaume Barthez de Marmorières (2 March 1707 – 11 January 1799) was a French civil engineer.

Biography
Son of an architect, he was born in Narbonne in southern France.
He became a civil engineer for the province of Languedoc. He was elected to the Académie des sciences et lettres de Montpellier (fr), gained a wide reputation through either his writings or the works he supervised.

He was called upon to edit or contribute two entries in the Encyclopédie of Diderot and d’Alembert.

He was made a hereditary nobleman de Marmorières in 1780 by letters patent of Louis XVI.

He was the father of Paul Joseph Barthez physician, physiologist and encyclopedist who developed the biological theory known as vitalism.

He died in Narbonne in 1799 at the age of 91.

Selected works
 
 Mémoires d’agriculture et de mécanique, avec les moyens de remédier aux abus du jaugeage des vaisseaux dans tous les ports du roi, Paris, 1763, in-8°

References

People from Narbonne
1707 births
1799 deaths
Contributors to the Encyclopédie (1751–1772)
18th-century French engineers